Franklin Lewis Ford (26 December 1920, Waukegan, Illinois – 31 August 2003, Lexington, Massachusetts) was an American history professor and dean.

Education and career
Franklin Ford received in 1942 his A.B. from the University of Minnesota. From 1943 to 1946 he served in the U.S. Army Signal Corps and the Office of Strategic Services. At Harvard University he graduated with M.A. in 1948 and Ph.D. in 1950. He specialized in modern German history and 17th-century French history. From 1949 to 1952 he taught at Bennington College. In Harvard University's history department, he was an assistant professor from 1953 to 1956, an associate professor 1956 to 1959, and a full professor from 1959 to 1991, when he retired as professor emeritus. In 1968 he was named the McLean Professor of Ancient and Modern History. At Harvard he was Faculty of Arts and Sciences dean from 1962 to 1970 (as successor to McGeorge Bundy)  and acting dean during spring 1973.

Ford was a Guggenheim Fellow for the academic year 1952–1953. In 1961 he was elected a Fellow of the American Academy of Arts and Sciences. He was elected to the American Philosophical Society in 1974. He was at the Institute for Advanced Study for the first six months of 1974.

Ford was the author of four books and was working on a book on the history of the Huguenots when he died. Upon his death he was survived by his widow, two sons, and a granddaughter.

Selected publications

References

1920 births
2003 deaths
People from Waukegan, Illinois
Historians from Illinois
20th-century American historians
American male non-fiction writers
University of Minnesota alumni
Harvard University alumni
Harvard University faculty
Fellows of the American Academy of Arts and Sciences
20th-century American male writers
United States Army personnel of World War II
Bennington College faculty
Members of the American Philosophical Society